Lipowina  is a village in the administrative district of Gmina Braniewo, within Braniewo County, Warmian-Masurian Voivodeship, in northern Poland, close to the border with the Kaliningrad Oblast of Russia.

The village has a population of 892.

Notable residents
 Friedrich Wilhelm, Duke of Schleswig-Holstein-Sonderburg-Glücksburg (1785-1831)

References

Lipowina